Viktor Vladimirovich Maslov (born on 16 January 1976 in Surgut) is a Russian race car driver. Maslov spent six years in top-level karting, debuting in 1989, before competing in the premiere ice racing event Trophy Andros in 1996. In 1996 Maslov also competed in Russian Formula Three. In 1997 Maslov again competed in both categories, staying with the Daewoo team in Andros, before landing a 1998 seat with Italian Formula Three team Lukoil.

Maslov joined Arden Motorsport in 1999, driving for the team in both Italian Formula 3000 and International Formula 3000. He continued to do the same until 2001, when he drove in Formula 3000 only. He left Arden at the end of 2001.

Racing record

Career summary

Complete International Formula 3000 results
(key) (Races in bold indicate pole position) (Races in italics indicate fastest lap)

External links
 Official site 
 Maslov career statistics at Driver Database

1976 births
Living people
Russian racing drivers
Auto GP drivers
International Formula 3000 drivers
People from Surgut
Arden International drivers